Tervola is a municipality of Finland.

It is located in the province of Lapland, Finland. The municipality has a population of 
which 
is water. The population density is
.

Neighbour municipalities are Keminmaa, Ranua, Rovaniemi, Simo, Tornio and Ylitornio.

The municipality is unilingually Finnish.

History 
Tervola is named after its first Finnish settler, a Savonian named Olli Paavonpoika Tervonen, mentioned on a tax list from the year 1579. The part of the Kemijoki between Paakkola and Rovaniemi was essentially uninhabited before his family's arrival. 

The area was originally subordinate to Kemi, becoming a chapel community in 1627 under the name Lapinniemi, while the settlement name Tervola was first mentioned in 1796. Tervola became an independent parish in 1860.

References

External links

Municipality of Tervola – Official website